Vinary is a village and administrative part of Přerov in the Olomouc Region of the Czech Republic.

References
 

Villages in Přerov District
Neighbourhoods in the Czech Republic